C. hastatus may refer to:
 Coccorchestes hastatus, Balogh, 1980, a jumping spider species in the genus Coccorchestes found in New Guinea
 Coluber hastatus, a synonym for Bothrops lanceolatus, a snake species endemic to  Martinique
 Corydoras hastatus, the dwarf corydoras, dwarf catfish, tail spot pigmy catfish or micro catfish, a tropical freshwater fish

See also
 Hastatus (disambiguation)